The Tseung Kwan O-Lam Tin Tunnel is a tunnel in Hong Kong that is part of Route 6. Originally expected to open in 2021, its opening was delayed to 11 December 2022 due to the worldwide outbreak of COVID-19.

The tunnel connects Lam Tin to the Tseung Kwan O residential area. The eastern edge of the tunnel project connects directly with the Cross Bay Link to LOHAS Park.

See also
 Cross Bay Link
 Black Hill, Hong Kong

References 

Tunnels in Hong Kong
Route 6 (Hong Kong)